Kate and Charles Noel Vance House is a mansion located in Black Mountain, Buncombe County, North Carolina. It was listed on the National Register of Historic Places in 2016.

History 
The house sits high on a hill on the east side of Black Mountain, at 178 Sunset Drive, about one mile from the center of downtown. The two-and-a-half-story Queen Anne frame house, designed by Asheville-based architect Arthur Melton, was built around 1894. The building faces west and overlooks the central business district and Interstate. The building is about a mile from downtown Black Mountain.

Charles Noel Vance, son of North Carolina Senator Zebulon Baird Vance and his wife Kate, owned the property. During his father's time in the United States Senate, Vance served him as his secretary.

References

National Register of Historic Places in Buncombe County, North Carolina
Queen Anne architecture in North Carolina
Buildings and structures completed in 1894
Buildings and structures in Buncombe County, North Carolina